John Raleigh (born 31 March 1890) was an Irish hurler who played for the Tipperary senior team.

Raleigh made his first appearance for the team during the 1913 championship and was a regular member of the starting fifteen until he left the panel after the 1915 championship. During that time he won one Munster medal and one Croke Cup medal. Raleigh was an All-Ireland runner-up on one occasion.

At club level Raleigh played with Emly.

References

1890 births
Year of death missing
Tipperary inter-county hurlers
Emly hurlers